Mohammad Amin Aram Tab is an Iranian football defender who plays for  Esteghlal Khuzestan in Iran Pro League.

Club career
Aram Tab joined Saba Qom in 2012 after spending the previous year at Aluminium Hormozgan.

Honours

Club
Aluminium Hormozgan
Azadegan League (1): 2011–12

Persepolis
Persian Gulf Pro League (1): 2016–17

References

External links
 Mohammad Amin Aram Tab at Persian League

Living people
Tarbiat Yazd players
Nassaji Mazandaran players
Aluminium Hormozgan F.C. players
Saba players
Iranian footballers
1985 births
Association football fullbacks
Persepolis F.C. players
Esteghlal Khuzestan players
People from Behbahan
Sportspeople from Khuzestan province